Nickel–aluminium alloy may refer to:
 Y alloy, series of aluminium alloys with addition of nickel developed during WWI;
 Hiduminium, series of aluminium alloys with addition of nickel developed before WWII;
 Nickel aluminide, alloys containing much more nickel than the previous ones.